African Queens is the fourth studio album recorded by American female vocal trio The Ritchie Family, released in 1977 on the Marlin label.

History
The album features the track, "Quiet Village", which peaked at No. 1 on the Hot Dance/Disco chart along with songs "African Queens" and "Summer Dance". "Quiet Village" also peaked at No. 68 on the Hot Soul Singles chart.

Track listing

Personnel
Gwendolyn Oliver, Cassandra Ann Wooten and Cheryl Mason Jacks - Vocalists
Russell Dabney – drums
Alfonso Carey – Fender bass
Jimmy Lee – lead guitar
Rodger Lee – rhythm guitar
Nathaniel "Crocket" Wilke – Fender Rhodes electric piano, clarinet
Babatunde Olatunji – Ngoma drums, Shekere, bongos
Ralph MacDonald – tambourines, triangle, bell tree, cowbell
Mario Grillo – timbales
Anthony Robinson – congas
J.M. Diatta – ngoma drums
Charles Payne – Djembe

Production
Jacques Morali – producer, rhythm, percussion and vocal arrangements
Henri Belolo – executive producer
Phil Hurtt – vocal arrangements
Horace Ott – strings and horns arrangements
Gerald Block – engineer
Carla Bandini, Jeff Stewart – assistant engineers
John Galluzzi – photographer

Charts

Singles

References

External links
 

1977 albums
The Ritchie Family albums
Albums produced by Jacques Morali
Albums recorded at Sigma Sound Studios
Marlin Records albums
Depictions of Cleopatra in music
Cultural depictions of Nefertiti
Songs about Egypt